The Ducati Road 350 is a  single cylinder bevel drive SOHC motorcycle produced by the Spanish manufacturer MotoTrans, who were licensed by Ducati to produce motorcycles under the Ducati brand name and was produced from 1973 to 1976. The model was intended to be for the Spanish domestic market although it was also exported to the US in 1973.

History
In post-Civil War Spain, the Franco regime banned the import of motorcycles and also forbade foreign nationals from settling in Spain, or stating a business there. MotoTrans was set up to manufacture Ducati motorcycles under licence in Barcelona in 1957.

The Road 250 was introduced in 1972 as a Spanish version of the 250 Scrambler and the 350 version introduced a year later in 1973. The 350 used the 'wide case' engine. A locally built Amal carburettor and Spanish Telesco front forks were fitted. The bike was finished in Black with a metallic burnt orange tank and mudguards and chrome headlight.

The American Ducati importers, Berliner Motor Corporation, were in dispute with the Italian factory over pricing from 1971 to '73 and chose to import from MotoTrans instead during this period. Amongst the models imported in '73 was the Road 350.

Technical details

Engine and transmission
The single cylinder bevel drive OHC engine was of unit construction and had an alloy head and alloy barrel with cast iron liners. A 10:1 piston was fitted.

Fuel was delivered by a Spanish made 30 mm Amal Concentric carburettor. The engine used wet sump lubrication and ignition was by battery and coil.

Primary drive was by gears to a multi-plate wet clutch and 5 speed gearbox. Chain drive took power to the rear wheel.

Cycle parts
The single cradle frame used the engine as a stressed member. Rear suspension was by swinging arm with twin adjustable shock absorbers. At the front telescopic forks were fitted. Brakes were drums, the front being  diameter and the rear .

References

Bibliography

External links
 

Road 250
Standard motorcycles
Motorcycles introduced in 1972
Single-cylinder motorcycles